José María Ruiz-Mateos Sociedad Anónima (Rumasa) was a holding company founded by Spanish entrepreneur José María Ruiz Mateos and expropriated by the Spanish government on February 23, 1983.

In 1982 Rumasa constituted 2% of the Spanish GDP. The 700 different businesses with 65000 employees forming the holding, from banks to hotels, were partitioned and reprivatizated.

Ruiz Mateos fled the country days after the expropriation and was later jailed in Spain. The expropriation was ruled constitutional by the Spanish Constitutional Court in 1986. Ruíz Mateos was acquitted by the Spanish Supreme Court in 1999, though he has never been compensated by the Spanish state.

Ruiz Mateos later founded "Nueva Rumasa" ("New Rumasa" ), which filed for bankruptcy in 2011 after issuing a series of highly controversial IOU's .

References 

 Real Decreto-Ley 2/1983, de 23 de febrero, de expropiación, por razones de utilidad pública e interés social, de los bancos y otras sociedades que componen el grupo "RUMASA, S. A."
 Sentencia 111/1983, de 2/12/1983, del pleno del Tribunal Constitucional de España, desestimando el recurso de inconstitucionalidad núm. 116/1983, promovido por José María Ruiz Gallardón, como representante y comisionado de cincuenta y cuatro Diputados más, contra el Real Decreto-ley 2/1983.
 Sentencia 6/1991, de 15 de enero, del pleno del Tribunal Constitucional de España, en la cuestión de inconstitucionalidad 1628/1989, en relación con los articulos 1 y 2 de la ley 7/1983, de 29 de junio, sobre expropiación por razones de utilidad pública e interés social de los bancos y otras sociedades que componen el "grupo RUMASA, Sociedad Anonima".
 web de noticias útiles para los inversores de Nueva Rumasa 
 Artículo de El Mundo
 Artículo de Cinco Días
 Ramón Tamames. La economía española : 1975-1995
 La colmena, revista interna del grupo Rumasa.

Defunct companies of Spain
1983 disestablishments in Spain